John Ernest Aubin (June 29, 1907 – March 6, 1999) was a Canadian breaststroke swimmer who competed in the 1928 Summer Olympics in Amsterdam.

He was born in Twickenham, England.

At the 1928 Olympics, he was eliminated in the first round of the 200-metre breaststroke event.  Two years later, he won the 200-yard breaststroke competition at the 1930 British Empire Games.

See also
 List of Commonwealth Games medallists in swimming (men)

External links

profile

1907 births
1999 deaths
Canadian male breaststroke swimmers
Commonwealth Games gold medallists for Canada
Olympic swimmers of Canada
Swimmers at the 1928 Summer Olympics
Swimmers at the 1930 British Empire Games
Commonwealth Games medallists in swimming
British emigrants to Canada
20th-century Canadian people
Medallists at the 1930 British Empire Games